Holt is a surname.

Etymology
Holt is a surname and placename, of Proto-Germanic origin and meaning a small wood or grove of trees. It derives from the Old English word holt and is a near-synonym of "wold" (from Old English wald), originally denoting a forested upland. Those words are cognate with the modern German words "Holz" and "Wald" respectively.

The word is also found in Scandinavian placenames and in surnames derived from them: in Danish, Norwegian, and Icelandic as Holt (or the more archaic Danish Holdt and Holte); in Swedish as Hult or Hulte; and even in Finnish as Hulti (a loanword from Swedish). It is often used in combination with other words, as in Uhrenholdt ("ancient holt", a Danish last name taken from that of an estate) or Älghult ("elk holt"), a village and the site of a small art-glass factory in Småland, Sweden. In Sweden it is most commonly found in and around Småland, including Älmhult, the location of the first IKEA store.

Another spelling of the name is "Hoult", more commonly found in the north of England than in the south.

Related German names include Holz, Holzman, Holzhauer, et al., and their anglicized equivalents which often insert a "t" between the "l" and the "z".

Notable people named Holt

 Alfred Holt (1829–1911), English steamship designer and ship owner
 Alfred Holt (cricketer) (1863–1942), English cricketer
 Anne Holt (born 1958), Norwegian crime novelist and lawyer
 Andrew Holt (disambiguation), several people
 Arthur Holt (sportsman) (1911–1994), Hampshire cricketer and Southampton footballer
 Arthur Holt (politician) (1914–1995), English politician
 Benjamin Holt (1849–1920), American machinery inventor 
 Bob Holt (disambiguation), several people
 Brian Van Holt (born 1969), American actor
 Brock Holt (born 1988), American baseball player
 Chad Holt (1972–2019), American actor, writer, and criminal
 Charles A. Holt, behavioral economist
 Charles C. Holt (1921–2010), professor at McCombs School of Business, Texas
 Charlotte C. Holt, American activist and lawyer
 Chris Holt (baseball coach) (born 1979), American baseball coach
 Chris Holt (ice hockey) (born 1985), goaltender
 Claire Holt (born 1988), Australian actress
 David Holt (musician) (born 1946), American musician
 Edwin Holt (1873–1946), Harvard professor of philosophy and psychology
 Elinor Holt, voice actress
 Ernest William Lyons Holt (1864–1922)
 Fritz Holt (1940–1987), American theatre producer and director
 Gary Holt (footballer) (born 1973)
 Gary Holt (musician) (born 1964)
 Georgia Holt (1926–2022), American singer
 Grant Holt (born 1981), English footballer
 Gwynneth Holt (1909–1995), British artist
 Hamilton Holt (1872–1951), former president of Rollins College
 Harold Holt (1908–1967), Prime Minister of Australia
 Harold Holt (impresario) (1885–1953), South African-English impresario
 Hazel Holt (1928–2015), British novelist
 Helen F. Holt (1913–2015), American politician
 Henry Holt (North Dakota politician) (1887–1944), lieutenant governor
 Henry Holt (publisher), of Baltimore, US; founded Henry Holt and Company (now Holt McDougal)
 Henry E. Holt (born 1929), astronomer
 Henry H. Holt (1831–1898), Michigan politician, lieutenant governor
 Henry W. Holt, Associate Justice and Chief Justice of the Supreme Court of Virginia
 Herbert Samuel Holt (1856–1941), former president of the Royal Bank of Canada
 Herbert Holt, rugby league footballer of the 1920s
 Homer A. Holt (1898–1975), American politician
 Jack Holt (actor) (1888–1951)
 Jack Holt (dinghy designer) (1912–1995)
 Jefferson Holt, former manager of rock band R.E.M.
 Jennifer Holt (1920–1997), American actress
 Jim Holt (Arkansas politician) (born 1965)
 JoBea Way Holt (born 1954), planetary scientist
 John Holt (disambiguation), various people
 Joseph Holt (1807–1894), American judge
 Joseph Holt (rebel) (1756–1826), United Irish general
 Justice Holt (disambiguation)
 Kåre Holt (1916–1997), Norwegian author
 Kristen Holt, Canadian educator and Abercrombie & Fitch model
 Lester Holt (born 1959), American news journalist
 Lou Holtz, American college football coach
 Luther Emmett Holt (1855–1924), pediatrician and author
 Luther Emmett Holt Jr. (1895–1974), pediatrician
 Marjorie Holt (1920–2018), United States representative from Maryland
 Maxwell Holt (born 1987), American volleyball player
 Michael Holt (author) (born 1929)
 Michael Holt (musician) (born 1968)
 Michael Holt (snooker player) (born 1978)
 Mike Holt (1931–2008), South African boxer (birth name Antione Michael Holthausen)
 Mister Terrific (Michael Holt), fictional character in the DC Universe
 Nancy Holt (1938–2014), American artist
 Olivia Holt (born 1997), American actress 
 Orrin Holt (1792–1855), United States representative from Connecticut
 Peter Holt (born 1948), American businessman
 Pierce Holt (born 1962), American football player
 Randy Holt (born 1953), Canadian ice hockey player
 Ric Holt, Canadian computer scientist
 Robert Holt (1913–1985), American academic author
 Rod Holt (born 1934), American computer engineer 
 Rosie Holt, British actress, comedian and writer
 Rush D. Holt, Jr., a U.S. Representative from New Jersey
 Rush D. Holt, Sr., a U.S. Senator from West Virginia
 Ryves Holt (1696–1763), Chief Justice of the Delaware Supreme Court
 Sam B. Holt (1902–?), American college basketball coach
 Sandrine Holt (born 1972), model and actress
 Seth Holt (1923–1971), British film director and producer
 Simeon ten Holt (1923–2012), Dutch composer
 Simma Holt (1922–2015), Canadian journalist and politician
 Simon Holt (born 1958), British composer
 Sophia Holt (1658–1734), Dutch painter
 Steve Holt (disambiguation), several people
 Susan Holt, Canadian politician in New Brunswick
 Terrence Holt (born 1980), American football player; younger brother of Torry Holt
 Terrence Holt (writer), American writer
 Thomas Holt (American architect), American architect
 Thomas Holt (English architect), English architect
 Thomas Michael Holt (1831–1896), textile manufacturer, whose company later became part of Burlington Industries
 Tim Holt (1919–1973), American actor
 Tim Holt (statistician) (born 1943)
 Tom Holt (born 1961), British novelist
 Torry Holt (born 1976), American football player; older brother of Terrence Holt
 Victor Holt (1908–1988), American basketball player
 Victoria Holt, pseudonym of Eleanor Alice Burford Hibbert, British author
 William Holt (disambiguation), several people
 Yvette Holt (born 1971), Australian poet

Notable people with variants of the name

 Axel Petersson Döderhultarn (born Axel Petersson; 1868–1925), Swedish woodcarver
 Laura Pendergest-Holt (born 1973), convicted Ponzi scheme operator
 Jacob Holdt (born 1947), Danish photojournalist 
 Johan Hultin (born 1924), Swedish-American pathologist
 Astrid Uhrenholdt Jacobsen, Norwegian Olympic cross-country skier

Places with names derived from Holt and variants

 Älmhult Municipality, Kronoberg County, Sweden
 Diepholz town and capital of the district of Diepholz, in Lower Saxony, Germany
 Döderhult, parish in Oskarshamn Municipality, Kalmar County, Sweden; Misterhult is a nearby parish
 Oskarshamn, city, earlier called Döderhultsvik (orig. Duderhultevik), after the nearby bay, which is still called Döderhultsvik (vik=bay)
 Esholt, a village in the City of Bradford in the metropolitan county of West Yorkshire, England
 Holte, northern suburb of Metropolitan Copenhagen, Rudersdal municipality, Denmark
 Hult, a village in Eksjö Municipality, Jönköping County, Sweden
 Hultsfred, seat of Hultsfred Municipality, Kalmar County, Sweden and location of the Hultsfred Festival
 Northolt, a suburb of North London (formerly in Middlesex)
 Reykholt, Iceland (reyk=smoke)
 Råshult village, Kronoberg County, Småland, Sweden, birthplace of Carl Linnaeus 
 Stenbrohult, the parish in which Råshult is located
 Schloß Holte-Stukenbrock, town in the district of Gütersloh in the state of North Rhine-Westphalia, Germany
 Skálholt (Old Icelandic: Skálaholt) important historical site in southeast Iceland

See also
 Holte (surname)
 Hult (disambiguation)
 Hult (surname)

References

Low German surnames
German-language surnames
Dutch-language surnames
English-language surnames
Danish-language surnames
Norwegian-language surnames